"Endless Sleep" is a "teenage tragedy" pop song written and originally recorded by rockabilly singer Jody Reynolds in 1957.

Background
Reynolds wrote the song in 1956, after listening to Elvis Presley's "Heartbreak Hotel", and first performed it soon afterwards at a performance in Yuma, Arizona.  The song told the story of a teenager whose girlfriend had gone missing after a row: The night was black, rain fallin' downLooked for my baby, she's nowhere aroundTraced her footsteps down to the shoreAfraid she's gone for ever more   
Although record companies initially rejected the song as too depressing, Reynolds eventually had a demo accepted by Demon Records in Los Angeles, who agreed that Reynolds record it provided that he changed the song's ending so that the protagonist saved the girl from drowning.:I looked at the sea and it seemed to say“You took your baby from me away"My heart cried out “She's mine to keep"I saved my baby from an endless sleep.

The song was recorded with echo-drenched vocals, and with Al Casey and Howard Roberts on guitars.  The record label credited the songwriting to Reynolds and the fictitious "Dolores Nance", in order to make it appear to have been written by a 'professional' songwriting team.

Chart performance
Reynolds' recording reached the number 5 position on the U.S. Billboard Hot 100 chart on July 7, 1958, sold over one million copies, and inspired a trend of "teen tragedy" songs. The song was reissued in 1979 reaching number 66 on the UK singles chart. Reynolds' recording also went to number 5 on the Most Played R&B By Jockeys chart.
A re-recorded version by Reynolds appears the 1984 Rhino compilation LP Teenage Tragedies.

Other versions
In Britain, the song was covered by Marty Wilde, whose version reached number 4 on the UK singles chart, becoming his first chart hit.  
The song was later recorded by:
Marc Bolan
Don Williams
Vince Taylor
the Judds, John Fogerty
The Poppy Family
Billy Idol
Robert Gordon
Hank Williams, Jr.'s version was a modest country music chart success.
A version by Billy Bremner and Fast Buck was also released as a single

References

1958 songs
1958 singles
Teenage tragedy songs
Shakin' Stevens songs